Yamogenin is a chemical compound of the class called sapogenins. It is found in the herb fenugreek (Trigonella foenum-graecum) and other plants.

References 

Triterpenes
Alcohols
Spiro compounds
Cyclopentanes
Tetrahydrofurans
Tetrahydropyrans